The 1930–31 Lancashire Cup was the twenty-third occasion on which the Lancashire Cup competition had been held. St Helens Recs won the trophy by beating Wigan in the final by the score of 5-4.

Competition and results  
The number of teams entering this year’s competition remained at 13 which resulted in 3 byes in the first round.

Round 1  
Involved  5 matches (with three byes) and 13 clubs

Round 2 – quarterfinals  
Involved 4 matches and 8 clubs

Round 3 – semifinals 
Involved 2 matches and 4 clubs

Final 
The final was played at Station Road, Pendlebury, Salford, (historically in the county of Lancashire). The attendance was 16,710 and receipts were £1,030.

Teams and scorers 

Scoring - Try = three (3) points - Goal = two (2) points - Drop goal = two (2) points

The road to success

Notes 

1 * RUGBYLEAGUEproject shows Broughton Rangers as the home team with the match played at City Road but the official Wigan archives give Wigan as the home team playing at Central Park

2 * Station Road was the home ground of Swinton from 1929 to 1992 and at its peak was one of the finest rugby league grounds in the country and it boasted a capacity of 60,000. The actual record attendance was for the Challenge Cup semi-final on 7 April 1951 when 44,621 watched Wigan beat Warrington 3-2

See also 
1930–31 Northern Rugby Football League season
List of defunct rugby league clubs

References

External links
Saints Heritage Society
1896–97 Northern Rugby Football Union season at wigan.rlfans.com
Hull&Proud Fixtures & Results 1896/1897
Widnes Vikings - One team, one passion Season In Review - 1896-97
The Northern Union at warringtonwolves.org

RFL Lancashire Cup
Lancashire Cup